Gish is an album by the Smashing Pumpkins.

Gish may also refer to:

 Gish (surname)
 Gish (video game), an action computer game
 Gish station, a light-rail station in San Jose, California
 Great Gish, war god of the Kafir people of Hindu Kush
 GISH, an annual international scavenger hunt, formerly known as GISHWHES
 Use of the Gish gallop or gishing tactic in debate

See also
 Gish Jen (born 1956), American writer
 Gish Abay, an Ethiopian town
 Gish Bar Patera, a crater on Jupiter's moon Io
 Kiş (disambiguation)